Foster, Swift, Collins & Smith, P.C. is a law firm in the American state of Michigan, founded in 1902. Foster Swift has offices in Lansing, Southfield, Grand Rapids, Michigan, Holland and St. Joseph. It is the largest law firm in Lansing and the 13th largest in the state, according to the 2016 survey conducted by Michigan Lawyers Weekly.

Practice groups
 Administrative & Municipal
 Business & Corporate Law
 Employer Services
 Finance, Real Estate & Bankruptcy Services
 General & Commercial Litigation
 Health Care
 Trusts and Estates

Recognition
 Martindale-Hubbell Peer Review Rating

Forty-two attorneys hold AV Preeminent rating
 Best Law Firms in America

Ranked a tier 1 law firm in 26 different practice areas

References

External links
Official Website
The Pickett Law Group
Admiral Accident Number
Info For Truck Accident Victims

Companies based in Lansing, Michigan
Law firms based in Michigan
Law firms established in 1902
1902 establishments in Michigan